ThunderCats is an American media franchise, featuring a fictional group of catlike humanoid aliens. The characters were created by Tobin "Ted" Wolf and originally featured in an animated television series named ThunderCats, running from 1985 to 1989, which was animated by Japanese studio Pacific Animation Corporation, and co-produced by Rankin-Bass Animated Entertainment.

Like its predecessor Masters of the Universe, the ThunderCats franchise simultaneously launched as a line of action figures produced by LJN and a syndicated after-school weekday cartoon.

History 
The original ThunderCats show was animated in Japan while being produced, written and voice acted in the United States.

The series was originally distributed by Rankin-Bass Productions' then parent company Telepictures Corporation, which would later merge with Lorimar Productions in February 1986. In January 1989, Lorimar-Telepictures was purchased by and folded into Warner Bros., whose television syndication arm would eventually assume distribution of the show; Warner Bros. has owned the rights to the series (and all Lorimar Telepictures programming) from that point on.

Notable characters 

 Bengali
 Cheetara
 Claudus
 Jagara
 Jaga
 Lion-O
 Lynx-O
 Panthro
 Pumyra
 Snarf
 Snarfer
 Tygra
 Wilykat
 Wilykit

Later adaptations

Comics 
There were also several comic book series produced. A ThunderCats comic book series based on the animated series was originally published by Marvel Comics through its Star Comics imprint in 1985, lasting for three years and twenty-four issues. During this time, a new series was published by Marvel UK consisting of 129 issues and was also published for three years.

Beginning in 2002, ThunderCats titles were published by Wildstorm Productions, an imprint of DC Comics (Warner Bros. corporate sibling), and included five non-canon miniseries and several one shots. 

In March 2012, Panini Comics began publishing a new series in the United Kingdom to tie-in with the television series of 2011, titled ThunderCats Magazine. The first issue featured a strip called Safe Haven which was written by Ferg Handley and drawn by Cosmo White. Each issue also included additional features, such as character profiles, puzzles, a reader art page and a poster.

Video game 
A side-scrolling video game based on the series, ThunderCats: The Lost Eye of Thundera, was published in 1987.

Other merchandise 
Items of clothing featuring the ThunderCats logo were available in the mid 1980s, and DVD boxsets releases of the original series helped new clothing products enjoy a resurgence in the mid to end of the 2000s, as nostalgia for the former children's favorite grew.

Film
A film adaptation of the series was announced in June 2007; Aurelio Jaro was to produce a CGI animated feature film of ThunderCats, based on a script written by Paul Sopocy. Jerry O'Flaherty, veteran video game art director, had signed on to direct. The film was being produced by Spring Creek Productions.

It was originally set for release in the summer of 2010, but the movie was never greenlit, and as of 2020, has yet to be produced. Concept art for the film has also been leaked online. In 2011, test footage in CGI was leaked onto YouTube. In 2017, during the promotion of Resident Evil: The Final Chapter, Milla Jovovich expressed interest to portray Cheetara.

In March 2021, it was announced that Warner Bros. was once more actively developing a live-action ThunderCats film with Adam Wingard set to direct the film, with a screenplay by Wingard and Simon Barrett, and Roy Lee and Dan Lin serving as producers.

Television series

ThunderCats (2011 TV series) 

A second television series of the same name premiered in 2011. It was initially planned to have a fifty-two episode-long first season, but it was shortened down to 26, and cancelled shortly after season one finished airing. It later had reruns on Adult Swim's Toonami block, alongside Sym-Bionic Titan.

ThunderCats Roar

A third ThunderCats cartoon, ThunderCats Roar, premiered on Cartoon Network in 2020. The show's developers are Victor Courtright and Marly Halpern-Graser. Courtright previously worked on Pickle and Peanut as a writer/storyboard artist and created the Cartoon Network Studios digital series Get 'Em Tommy!. Halpern-Graser previously worked as a writer for various DC Nation Shorts, and was co-creator of the show on Disney XD, Right Now Kapow.

ThunderCats Roar features an explicitly cartoonish art style with a more lighthearted, comedic tone than previous ThunderCats installments. The show's premise is similar to the original; the ThunderCats escape their dying homeworld Thundera, only to crash land on Third Earth, facing off against various villains and their evil overlord, Mumm-Ra.

However, after airing for only one season, it received negative reception from viewers, and the show was cancelled.

In popular culture
Rock band Relient K wrote the songs, "Lion Wilson" (an a cappella piece similar in style to what Brian Wilson or the Beach Boys would produce) and "I'm Lion-O" with clear references to Thundercats. Both songs appear on the 2001 album, The Anatomy of the Tongue in Cheek.

References 

 
Fictional humanoids
Television franchises introduced in 1985